João José Bracony (February 19, 1919 – July 3, 2016) was a Brazilian Olympic sailor in the Star class. He competed in the 1948 Summer Olympics, where he finished 14th together with Carlos Bittencourt Filho.

References

Olympic sailors of Brazil
Brazilian male sailors (sport)
Star class sailors
Sailors at the 1948 Summer Olympics – Star
1919 births
2016 deaths
Sportspeople from Rio de Janeiro (city)